Jack's Place is an American drama television series that aired from May 26, 1992 to July 13, 1993 on ABC. The series was about a retired jazz musician named Jack Evans (Hal Linden) who runs a restaurant where romances tend to start. The waitress, Chelsea, was played by Finola Hughes and the bartender Greg was played by John Dye.

History
A first attempt at the series, in 1991, starred Lou Rawls in a never-aired pilot. "ABC liked the idea but not the execution, I guess," his successor, Hal Linden, said the following year. ""So they hired a new producer, Scott Brazil, who rewrote it, recast it and got me on board." Linden speculated that his casting came from the character being "a former musician and bandleader performer, and so am I. Maybe they were going on that."

Cast
Hal Linden as Jack Evans
Finola Hughes as Chelsea

Episodes

Season 1 (1992)

Season 2 (1993)

Reception
The show was slated to simply be shown in the summer, but did well enough in the ratings that ABC decided to pick up the series for more episodes. Although initially having some success with audiences reviews tended toward the negative. Hence, Entertainment Weekly deemed it "drearily sentimental and banal" while Jon Burlingame was slightly more positive, describing it as a happy and unthreatening. Both reviewers compared it to The Love Boat and Cheers.

References

External links 
 

1992 American television series debuts
1993 American television series endings
1990s American drama television series
American Broadcasting Company original programming
English-language television shows
Television series by Disney–ABC Domestic Television
Television series set in restaurants